Gaetano Veneziano (Bisceglie, 1656 – Naples, 15 July 1716)  was an Italian composer. His son Giovanni Veneziano was also a composer.

Veneziano senior studied with Francesco Provenzale at the Conservatorio Santa Maria di Loreto in Naples in 1666; where in 1684 he became maestro di cappella. He defeated Cristoforo Caresana in a competition to succeed Alessandro Scarlatti as master of the Spanish royal chapel of Naples in 1704, but after only three years lost the post when the Austrians took control of Naples from the Spanish in 1707.

Recordings
 on Tenebrae - Musiche per la Settimana Santa a Napoli  Cappella della Pietà de' Turchini, dir. Antonio Florio. Glossa 2011.

References

1656 births
1716 deaths
Italian Baroque composers
Italian male classical composers
18th-century Italian composers
18th-century Italian male musicians